Dorothy Helen Mayer (7 September 1932 – 7 February 2008) was an Australian politician. Born in Kaniva, Victoria, she was educated at Swinburne Institute of Technology in Melbourne, and then Toorak Teachers' College, after which she became a teacher.

In 1983, she was elected to the Australian House of Representatives as the Labor member for Chisholm, defeating Liberal MP Graham Harris. It was her third try for the seat, having previously stood in 1977 and 1980. On the second occasion, she slashed the Liberal majority from a fairly safe eight percent to a very marginal two percent. She held the seat until her defeat in 1987. Mayer died in 2008.

References

Australian Labor Party members of the Parliament of Australia
Members of the Australian House of Representatives for Chisholm
Members of the Australian House of Representatives
1932 births
2008 deaths
Women members of the Australian House of Representatives
20th-century Australian politicians
20th-century Australian women politicians